Dakota Township is located in Stephenson County, Illinois. As of the 2010 census, its population was 815 and it contained 349 housing units. The village of Dakota and the unincorporated community of Afolkey are located in the township, and once Fountain Creek was located here also.

Geography
Dakota is Township 28 North, Range 8 (part) East of the Fourth Principal Meridian.

Demographics

References

External links
City-data.com
Stephenson County Official Site

Townships in Stephenson County, Illinois
Townships in Illinois